The fourteenth season of the American animated television series The Simpsons was originally broadcast on the Fox network in the United States between November 3, 2002, and May 18, 2003, and was produced by Gracie Films and 20th Century Fox Television. The show runner for the fourteenth production season was Al Jean, who executive produced 21 of 22 episodes. The other episode, "How I Spent My Strummer Vacation", was run by Mike Scully. The season was the first to use digital ink-and-paint for most of its episodes, though four episodes ("How I Spent My Strummer Vacation", "Bart vs. Lisa vs. the Third Grade", "Large Marge" and "Helter Shelter") were hold-overs from season 13's production run and used traditional ink-and-paint. A fifth season 13 holdover episode ("Treehouse of Horror XIII") was the first episode of season 14 to use digital ink-and paint. The fourteenth season has met with mostly positive reviews and won two Primetime Emmy Awards, including Outstanding Animated Program (For Programming less than One Hour), four Annie Awards and a Writers Guild of America Award. This season contains the show's 300th episode, "Barting Over".

Writers credited with episodes in the fourteenth season included J. Stewart Burns, Kevin Curran, John Frink & Don Payne, Dana Gould, Dan Greaney, Brian Kelley, Tim Long, Ian Maxtone-Graham, Carolyn Omine, Mike Scully, Matt Selman, John Swartzwelder, Matt Warburton and Marc Wilmore. Freelance writers included Brian Pollack & Mert Rich, Sam O'Neal & Neal Boushall, Dennis Snee and Allen Glazier. Animation directors included Bob Anderson, Mike B. Anderson, Chris Clements, Mark Kirkland, Lance Kramer, Nancy Kruse, Lauren MacMullan, Pete Michels, Steven Dean Moore, Matthew Nastuk, Michael Polcino, Jim Reardon and David Silverman. The main cast consisted of Dan Castellaneta (Homer Simpson, Grampa Simpson, Krusty the Clown, among others), Julie Kavner (Marge Simpson), Nancy Cartwright (Bart Simpson, Ralph Wiggum, Nelson Muntz), Yeardley Smith (Lisa Simpson), Hank Azaria (Moe Szyslak, Apu, Chief Wiggum, among others) and Harry Shearer (Ned Flanders, Mr. Burns, Principal Skinner, among others). Other cast members included Marcia Wallace (Edna Krabappel), Pamela Hayden (Milhouse Van Houten, among others), Tress MacNeille (Agnes Skinner, among others), Russi Taylor (Martin Prince) and Karl Wiedergott (Additional Voices). This season also saw the return of voice actress Maggie Roswell (Helen Lovejoy, Maude Flanders, among others), who had left the show during season 11 because of a contract dispute.

"Barting Over", which aired February 16, 2003, was promoted as the show's milestone 300th episode by Fox. However, "The Strong Arms of the Ma" was the 300th episode to be broadcast. According to Ben Rayner of the Toronto Star, "It's very difficult to find a straight answer why milestone status has been bestowed on ["Barting Over"]. Some rationalize that the 300 figure doesn't account for two early holiday specials, Fox maintains that there was some discrepancy between the original, scheduled broadcast date- deep in the heart of the ratings-mad February sweeps- and the number of episodes that were eventually aired leading up to it." "Barting Over" refers to the error when Marge tells Lisa "I can't count the number of times (Homer) has done something crazy like this." Lisa responds that it is 300, to which Marge replies that she "could have sworn it's been 302".

Reception 
Season 14 received generally positive reviews. High-Def Digest was positive recommending the set and writing "The show has numerous moments that make you laugh." and gave it 3.5/5 stars. Blu-ray.com also gave season 14 3.5/5 stars who thought "After rewatching all of it for the first time since this batch of episodes originally aired, I have to say—season fourteen has a pretty good laugh-per- minute ratio." Casey Broadwater also felt it was an improvement over the Scully seasons and season 13. Collider gave the season a B−. The reviewer thought "As far as the overall quality of the season, it isn't as consistently good as some earlier seasons but in the evolution of the show and the characters, it's solid.". Jackson Cresswell thought "C.E.D'oh" was the best of the season along with "Pray Anything" and "Brake My Wife, Please" while citing "Three Gays of the Condo", "Large Marge", and "Helter Shelter" as the worst. Ryan Keefer of DVD Talk gave it a 4/5 calling it "a good spot to start brushing up on things".

Awards

Episodes of the fourteenth season won several awards, including two Primetime Emmy Awards. "Three Gays of the Condo" became the eighth episode of the series to win the Primetime Emmy Award for Outstanding Animated Program (For Programming less than One Hour). Hank Azaria won an Emmy Award for Outstanding Voice-Over Performance for voicing various characters in the episode "Moe Baby Blues". It was Azaria's third Emmy in that category. The song "Everybody Hates Ned Flanders" (music by Alf Clausen, lyrics by Ian Maxtone-Graham and Ken Keeler) from "Dude, Where's My Ranch?" received a nomination for the Emmy Award for Outstanding Individual Achievement in Music and Lyrics.

The show also won four Annie Awards, including its 12th consecutive in the Outstanding Achievement in an Animated Television Production category. The other awards won were Best Directing in an Animated Television Production (Steven Dean Moore for 'Scuse Me While I Miss the Sky"), Best Music in an Animated Television Production (Alf Clausen, Ken Keeler and Ian Maxtone-Graham for "Dude, Where's My Ranch?") and Best Writing in an Animated Television Production (Matt Warburton for "Three Gays of the Condo"). "The Dad Who Knew Too Little" (written by Matt Selman) won a Writers Guild of America Award in 2004 in the animation category. "Moe Baby Blues", written by J. Stewart Burns, was also nominated in the category.

The series was nominated for the Golden Globe Award for Best Musical or Comedy Series in 2003. It was the first time The Simpsons had been nominated for the award. The episode Scuse Me While I Miss the Sky", nominated for an Environmental Media Award for Best Television Episodic Comedy. Chris Ledesma was nominated for the Golden Reel Award for Best Sound Editing in Television Animation – Music for his work on "Large Marge".

Episodes

<onlyinclude>{{#invoke:Episode table|main
|background=#000000
|overall    = 
|season     = 
|title      = 
|director   = 
|writer     = 
|airdate    = 
|prodcode   = 
|viewers    = 
|country    = U.S.
|episodes   =

{{#invoke:Episode list|sublist|The Simpsons (season 14)
|EpisodeNumber=301
|EpisodeNumber2=10
|Title=Pray Anything
|DirectedBy=Mike Frank Polcino
|WrittenBy=Sam O'Neal & Neal Boushell
|OriginalAirDate=
|ProdCode=EABF06
|ShortSummary=Homer becomes depressed when he sees that Ned Flanders seems to be better off than him. To remedy this, he begins to pray constantly. Meanwhile, the Simpsons discover that tree roots have clogged up their plumbing. The house becomes too run down to live in, and Homer prays for a solution. Homer is injured while attending church; he sues Reverend Lovejoy and is awarded the deed to the church. He throws a huge house-warming party, in which all of the partiers drink and engage in sinful activities. It suddenly starts raining and the town begins to flood. The townspeople flee to the roof of the church. Homer tries praying again but the flood keeps rising. Reverend Lovejoy returns in a helicopter and leads everyone in prayer, asking God to forgive them, and the rain stops.

Guest stars: Lisa Leslie and Ken Burns.
|Viewers=13.4<ref>{{cite news |last=Kissell |first=Rick |title='Simpsons,' 'Law,' '60 shine Sunday |date=February 10, 2003 |work=Variety |url=https://variety.com/2003/tv/news/simpsons-law-60-shine-sunday-1117880315/ |quote='13.4 million viewers overall |access-date=August 8, 2013}}</ref>
|LineColor=000000
}}

}}</onlyinclude>

Blu-ray and DVD release
The DVD and Blu-ray boxset for season fourteen was released by 20th Century Fox Home Entertainment in the United States and Canada on Tuesday, December 6, 2011, eight years after it had completed broadcast on television. As well as every episode from the season, the Blu-ray and DVD releases feature bonus material including deleted scenes, animatics, and commentaries for every episode. The boxart features Kang, and a special limited edition "embossed head case" package was also released.

ReferencesBibliography'''

External links
 Season 14 at The Simpsons.com
 Season 14 at Internet Movie Database

Simpsons season 14
2002 American television seasons
2003 American television seasons